René de Buxeuil, pseudonym for Jean-Baptiste Chevrier, (4 June 1881 – 29 July 1959) was a 20th-century French composer and chansonnier.

Biography 
De Buxeuil's parents ran the bistro Les prévoyants de l'avenir in La Haye-Descartes. In 1852 a comrade accidentally shot a pellet rifle. He received the discharge in the eye. Blinded, he was placed in the Institut National des Jeunes Aveugles in Paris, where he was taught music. He won first prize for harmony, piano and clarinet. He began writing songs which he played for school holidays or in the cafe of his parents.

A young man, De Buxeuil attended le Bijou-Concert and met Montmartre chansonniers Xavier Privas, Paul Delmet and Eugène Lemercier. He wrote several songs related to current events and politicians, then he discovered the café-concerts. He performed there and met his first interpreters. To make a living, he accompanied silent films on the piano and gave singing lessons. One of his students would experience fame c. 1909 under the name Damia.

Before World War I, he attended the Montparnasse area. At Théâtre de la Gaîté, he met  who sang him some tunes. He also sang at Gabriel Montoya in Montmartre and founded Les Loups, a literary society where Jehan Rictus rubbed shoulders with Gaston Couté, Steinlen, Émile Verhaeren or Willette. He signed his first successes interpreted by Junka, including L'âme des violons, etc.

During the war, he organized a theater for the Army and moved to sing on the front. After the war, he wrote L'âme des roses for the singer .

In 1924, he hired the then 14-year old Jean Genet who caused him thousand miseries. While the latter squandered the money of commissions, De Buxeuil filed a complaint. Genet was trapped in the Mettray Penal Colony for a year. The poet reported this terrible experience in Le journal d'un voleur.

De Buxeuil then managed his own musical editions.

A member of the Action française, de Buxeuil authored the music of its hymn La Royale and numerous other royalist songs. In 1938, he wrote Ô mon Morvan for Maryse Martin (1906–1984).

He is buried in Paris at Père Lachaise Cemetery (1st division). He had chosen his pseudonym as much to honor his birthplace (Buxeuil, lieu-dit Plancoulaine, close to Descartes), as to be the third renowned René (after René Descartes and René Boylesve) from the region of Descartes, commune of Touraine.

Songs (selection) 
 1938, Ô mon Morvan
 J'ai tout donné pour toi - lyrics by A. Waseige. music by René de Buxeuil
 Quand tout sera fini - sung by René de Buxeuil
 Ouvre tes jolis yeux - Lyrics by Nikola, music by René de Buxeuil
 1910–1920 - Son Amoureux - Lyrics by P. Alberty, music by René de Buxeuil (Ed. Delormel)

References

Bibliography 
 René de Buxeuil, Un demi-siècle en chantant, 1955, (self published)

External links 
 René de Buxeuil on Data.bnf.fr
 Site Handicap Visuel
 Portrait of the artist and his grace at Père Lachaise

French music publishers (people)
French chansonniers
French blind people
People from Indre-et-Loire
1881 births
1959 deaths
Burials at Père Lachaise Cemetery
20th-century French  male singers